is a Japanese import, export, wholesale and distribution company that mainly handles Asian food products. Established in 1912, the company is headquartered in Hamamatsuchō, Minato, Tokyo, and has branch offices around the world.

One of the subsidiaries of the Nishimoto Wismettac Group is Harro Foods in the UK.

References

External links
  
  
  

Food and drink companies of Japan